The Seobu Urban Expressway (Seobu Ganseon Doro) is 4-lane highway located in Seoul. South Korea. and part of National Route 1.

The highway is linked to the southwestern Metropolitan area, including Seoul and Anyang, light serves to facilitate transporting the cargo volume and alleviate traffic congestion in the metropolitan area southwest.

But because many roads are narrow roads and interchange without number up or down in the southern Gyeonggi Province cars coming around me and crowded roads and roads are seldom uncomplicated time.

History 
The expressway was built between 1987 and 1991.

Compositions

Lanes 
 Geumcheon IC ~ Mokdonggyo IC: 4
 Mokdonggyo IC ~ Seongsan Bridge: 6

Length 
9.8 km (6.1 mi)

Speed Limits 
 Geumcheon IC ~ Seongsan Bridge: 80 km/h
 Seongsan Bridge ~ Seongsan IC: 60 km/h

List of facilities 

 IC: Interchange, JC: Junction, SA: Service Area, TG: Tollgate

See also
List of streets in Seoul
Dongbu Urban Expressway

1991 establishments in South Korea
Roads in Seoul
National Route 1 (South Korea)